Two Yoo Project – Sugar Man is a 2015 South Korean television program starring various artists. The original 2-episode pilot aired at 22:50 (KST) on Wednesday (August 19 & 26, 2015) under the name Two Yoo Project Searching For Sugar Man. The regular broadcast of Season 1, hosted by Yoo Jae-suk, You Hee-yeol, Kim Eana and Sandara Park, kicked off beginning October 20, 2015, every Tuesday at 22:50 (KST), ended on July 12, 2016.

Season 2 airs starting January 14, 2018, every Sunday at 22:40 (KST). Park Na-rae and Joy (Red Velvet) join as MCs alongside Yoo Jae-suk and You Hee-yeol. The last episode of season 2 was aired on May 27, 2018.

Season 3 is confirmed to air from November 29, 2019, every Friday at 21:00 (KST). Kim Eana, who returns after being one of the MCs for Season 1, and Heize will join as MCs alongside Yoo Jae-suk and You Hee-yeol. The last episode of season 3 was aired on March 6, 2020.

Synopsis
The idea for the program began with the documentary Searching For Sugar Man, which refers to the 2012 Swedish–British documentary about American musician Sixto Rodriguez, who faded into obscurity in the United States but somehow ended up as a megastar in South Africa.

The program revolves around the battle of two teams led by Yoo Jae-suk and Yoo Hee-yeol. Each team will bring back a "Sugar Man": the singer who was a one-hit wonder, but has since disappeared from the public eye. The two teams recreate the old song, "Sugar Song", into new versions which will make them appealing to today's music market. To relive their glory, the songs will be recreated by each producer from each team with today's artist, "Show Man", who are slated to change every episode.

Cast

Pilot

Season 1

Season 2

Season 3

List of episodes
 – Team Yoo Jae-suk
 – Team You Hee-yeol

Pilot

Season 1

2015

2016

Notes

Season 2

Notes

Season 3

2019

2020

Notes

Original soundtrack

OST Part 1

OST Part 2

OST Part 3

OST Part 4

OST Part 5

OST Part 6

OST Part 7

OST Part 8

OST Part 9

OST Part 10

OST Part 11

OST Part 12

OST Part 13

OST Part 14

OST Part 15

Ratings
In the table below,  represent the lowest ratings and  represent the highest ratings.

Pilot

Season 1

2015

2016

Season 2

Season 3

2019

2020

References

External links
 
 
 

2020s South Korean television series
2015 South Korean television series debuts
Korean-language television shows
JTBC original programming
South Korean variety television shows
South Korean music television shows